Metapad is an open-source text editor for Microsoft Windows 9x/NT/XP/Vista/7, developed by Alexander Davidson since 1999. The aim of Metapad is to provide a near drop-in replacement of Notepad in Windows. Metapad was distributed as freeware for the first ten years of its existence.  On March 20, 2009, the 10th anniversary of its initial release, the Metapad source code was released under GPL-3.0-or-later.

Some of its key features include:
No file size limit under Windows 9x
UNIX text file support
Commit word wrap
Tab and newline search
Hyperlinking support
Auto-indent mode
Block indent and unindent
Language plugin support (though English is British-only)
Can replace Windows Notepad
A ‘portability mode’ to leave no traces in Windows Registry or export your metapad settings to a new computer

Metapad is programmed in pure ANSI C with the Win32 API. There are two versions of Metapad: a full and LE (light edition) version. The full version uses the RichEdit control which boasts more features, while the LE version uses the faster Edit control.

Reception 
Metapad received 3.5/5 score in a 2013 PCWorld review.

See also
List of text editors
Comparison of text editors

References

External links
 

Windows text editors
Notepad replacements
Windows-only freeware
Free text editors
Formerly proprietary software
1999 software
2011 software